Levi Yitzchak HaLevi Horowitz (born 3 July 1921, Boston, died 5 December 2009, Jerusalem) was a rabbi and the second rebbe of the Boston Hasidic Dynasty founded by his father, Pinchos Dovid Horowitz. He was the first American-born Hasidic rebbe and the founder of ROFEH International, a community-based medical referral and hospitality liaison support agency.

Family
Horowitz's parents were Pinchos Dovid Horowitz, founder of the Boston Hasidic dynasty, and Sora Sosha Horowitz. His father died in November 1941. In November 1942 he married Raichel Unger Leifer of Cleveland, Ohio, a descendant of Naftali Tzvi of Ropshitz.

Rabbinic career 
In 1943, Horowitz was one of over 400 rabbis led by Baruch Korff who traveled to Washington, D.C. just before Yom Kippur, to ask President Franklin D. Roosevelt to rescue Jews from Hitler.

Upon becoming leader of the Bostoners in 1944, after his marriage and ordination at Yeshiva Torah Vodaath, he announced that his primary thrust as rebbe would be aimed at the area's large number of college students, many of whom were away from home

In 1984, Horowitz established Givat Pincus, a Hasidic community in the Har Nof neighborhood of Jerusalem and began dividing his time between Israel and Boston. In 1999, an additional community was established in Beitar for the next generation of Bostoner Chassidim.

Horowitz served as a member of the Moetzes Gedolei HaTorah of Agudath Israel of Israel.

At the time of his death, he resided both in the U.S. and in Israel spending half a year in each country. Day-to-day leadership in his community had already passed on to his children.

Death and succession 
Horowitz suffered a cardiac arrest on July 6, 2009, and was hospitalized in the Sharei Tzedek hospital in Jerusalem. He died on December 5, 2009 and was buried that night on the Mount of Olives.

Per his will, he was succeeded by all his sons:
 his eldest son, the Chuster rabbi, Pinchos Dovid Horowitz (died 2021) as Bostoner rebbe of Borough Park, Brooklyn

 his second son, Mayer Alter, as Bostoner rebbe of Jerusalem

 his third son, Naftali Yehuda, as Bostoner rebbe of Boston.

References

External links 
ROFEH International

1921 births
2009 deaths
American Hasidic rabbis
People from Brookline, Massachusetts
Rebbes of Boston
Moetzes Gedolei HaTorah
Burials at the Jewish cemetery on the Mount of Olives